Binti may refer to:
Binti, female title of respect "daughter of" in Malaysian names
Binti Jua, female western gorilla in the Brookfield Zoo, outside Chicago
Binti (2019 film), Belgian film
Binti (2021 film), a Tanzanian drama film
Binti Trilogy, a series of novellas by Nnedi Okorafor
Binti (novella), the first in the trilogy
Binti: Home, the second novella in the series
Binti: The Night Masquerade, the third and final novella in the series